Sojat Road is a census town in Sojat tehsil of Pali district in the Indian state of Rajasthan. Sojat Road train station is located on Ajmer-Marwar Junction route and the most convenient method of traveling is by train.

Geography

Demographics
 India census, Sojat Road had a population of 12,470. Males constitute 51% (6,372) of the population and females 49% (6,098). Sojat Road has an average literacy rate of 68.34%.male literacy is 77.7%, and female literacy is 58.5%. In Sojat Road, 13.5% of the population is under 6 years of age.

References

Cities and towns in Pali district